Marley is a hamlet near the town of Deal in Kent, England. It is located about three miles (4.8 km) west of the town, on a minor road off the A258 road to Sandwich. The population of the hamlet is included in the civil parish of Northbourne.

References

Hamlets in Kent